Payne Cobblestone House is a historic home located at Conesus in Livingston County, New York. It was constructed in the 1830s and is a vernacular 1-story, five-by-three-bay cobblestone structure with a -story offset frame wing.  The interior features some Greek Revival style details.  It features medium-sized field cobbles set in horizontal rows in its construction.  Also on the property are three contributing structures: a sandstone railroad embankment and culvert built about 1853 and a small barrel vault culvert built to accommodate a small stream.

It was listed on the National Register of Historic Places in 2006.

References

Houses on the National Register of Historic Places in New York (state)
Cobblestone architecture
Houses in Livingston County, New York
National Register of Historic Places in Livingston County, New York